Mark Lemon Romer, Baron Romer, PC (9 August 1866 – 19 August 1944) was a British barrister and judge.

Biography 
Romer was born in Crawley, Sussex, the second son of Sir Robert Romer, later a Lord Justice of Appeal, and Betty, née Lemon, daughter of Mark Lemon, founding editor of Punch. He was educated at Rugby and Trinity Hall, Cambridge, where he read Mathematics, graduating as a junior optime. He was called to the bar by Lincoln's Inn in 1890. Practicing at the Chancery bar, he was made a King's Counsel in 1906 and attached himself to the court of Mr Justice Parker, then that of Mr Justice Sargant when Parker was elevated to the House of Lords.

Romer was appointed a judge of the Chancery Division of the High Court in 1922, in succession to Sir Arthur Frederick Peterson, and received the customary knighthood the same year. In 1929, he was made a Lord Justice of Appeal and sworn of the Privy Council. On 5 January 1938, he was appointed a Lord of Appeal in Ordinary in succession to Lord Roche and was made a life peer with the title Baron Romer, of New Romney in the County of Kent. He resigned as Lord of Appeal in April 1944, and died four months later. His son, Sir Charles Romer, was appointed to the Chancery Division two months after his death, following in the steps of both his father and grandfather.

Both Lord Romer's father, Sir Robert Romer (1840-1918), and his son, Sir Charles Romer (1897-1969), were also judges, serving as Lords Justices of Appeal in 1899-1906 and 1951-1960 respectively. All three had served in the Chancery Division of the High Court.

He married Anne Wilmot Ritchie, daughter of Charles Thomson Ritchie.

List of cases
Re Gardner (No.2) [1923] 2 Ch 230
Re City Equitable Fire Insurance Co [1925] Ch 407
France v James Coombes & Co [1928] 2 KB 81
Cotter v National Union of Seamen [1929] 2 Ch 58
Kirby v Wilkins [1929] Ch 444
Re Thompson [1934] Ch 342
Knightsbridge Estates Trust Ltd v Byrne [1940] AC 613 
Southern Foundries (1926) Ltd v Shirlaw [1940] AC 701
Nokes v Doncaster Amalgamated Collieries Ltd [1940] AC 1014

References

External links
 https://web.archive.org/web/20120331185148/http://www.cracroftspeerage.co.uk/online/content/index1769.htm
 

1866 births
1944 deaths
Chancery Division judges
Knights Bachelor
Law lords 
Members of the Judicial Committee of the Privy Council
English King's Counsel
People educated at Rugby School
Alumni of Trinity Hall, Cambridge
Members of the Privy Council of the United Kingdom
Lords Justices of Appeal
Members of Lincoln's Inn
Life peers created by George VI